Anita Waage (born 30 July 1971) is a former Norwegian football player and World Champion.

She played on the Norwegian team that won the 1995 FIFA World Cup in Sweden.

Career 
Her clubs include Spjelkavik IL, IK Grand Bodø, Trondheims-Ørn SK, and Kolbotn.

She has four Norwegian Cup championships (1994, 1996, 1997, 1998) and four series championships (1994, 1995, 1996, 1997) with Trondheims-Ørn.

References

External links 
 

1971 births
Living people
Norwegian women's footballers
Norway women's youth international footballers
Norway women's international footballers
1995 FIFA Women's World Cup players
FIFA Women's World Cup-winning players
Spjelkavik IL players
IK Grand Bodø players
SK Trondheims-Ørn players
Toppserien players
Women's association football defenders

Association football defenders